Gertrude Hoffmann is the name of:

 Gertrude Hoffmann (dancer) (1885–1966), American dancer and choreographer 
 Gertrude Hoffmann (actress) (1871–1968), German-born American actress